Abraham became an Avar khagan around 805. He was the successor of Theodor.

Abraham was baptised in Germany. He died or was deposed before 811 because in this year the Avar khagan was his successor.

Footnotes

References 
 Labuda Gerard: Abraham. In: Słownik Starożytności Słowiańskich. Vol 1. 1961, p. 1.

Further reading 
 Kos F.: Gradivo za zgodovino Slovencev v srednjem veku. Vol 2. Ljubljana 1912, p. 29, 39-40.

8th-century births
9th-century deaths
9th-century monarchs in Europe
Pannonian Avars
Christian Khagans